Gold box may refer to:

Decorative boxes made in gold
Gold Box, a series of video games of 1988 to 1992
Gold box (phreaking), a phreaking box to create a bridge between two telephone lines